The 2017 European Race Walking Cup took place on May 21, 2017. The races were held on a 1 km lap around the city park in Poděbrady, Czech Republic.

Medallists

Race results

Men's 20 km

Men's 50 km

Men's 10 km (U20)

Women's 20 km

Women's 10 km (U20)

Medal table (unofficial) 

 Note: Totals include both individual and team medals, with medals in the team competition counting as one medal.

Participation 
According to an unofficial count, 223 athletes from 27 countries participated.

 (3)
 (2)
 (8)
 (1)
 (3)
 (5)
 (6)
 (14)
 (14)
 (9)
 (7)
 (15)
 (6)
 (18)
 (5)
 (11)
 (2)
 (14)
 (9)
 (10)
 (1)
 (8)
 (18)
 (4)
 (3)
 (9)
 (18)

References 

Results

External links 
 Event website

European Race Walking Cup
International athletics competitions hosted by the Czech Republic
European Race Walking Cup
Race Walking Cup
European Race Walking Cup
European Race Walking Cup